Proteus Airlines was a French regional airline with its head offices in Saint-Apollinaire, Côte-d'Or, France, near Dijon, and in Saint-Étienne. Founded in 1986, it remained operational until 2001.

History
The airline was originally established in 1986 as Proteus Air System. In May 1996, it began scheduled services under its new name Proteus Airlines. In 1997 the airline acquired a regional airline, Air Transport Pyrénées and its fleet of Beech 1900 and Beech King Air, while in August signed a franchise agreement with Air France. In October 1999 Proteus acquired another regional airline, Flandre Air. On 30 March 2001, Proteus, Flandre, and Regional Airlines merged into Régional, itself merged into HOP! in 2013.

Incidents and accidents

On July 30, 1998, a Beechcraft 1900D, operating as Proteus Airlines Flight 706 from Lyon to Lorient in Brittany, was hit by a privately-owned Cessna 177RG over Quiberon Bay, killing all 15 people on board both aircraft. The biggest contributing factor to the accident was the crew of the 1900D electing to take a detour to fly around the SS Norway. While finishing the sightseeing pass over the ship and shifting their attention to landing preparations, the crew did not use the see and avoid concept that was part of the visual flight rules they were operating under. In addition, the pilot of the Cessna had neglected to turn on his plane's transponder, effectively making the aircraft invisible to radar systems on the ground.

References

External links

 Proteus Airlines  (Archive)

Defunct airlines of France
Airlines established in 1986
Airlines disestablished in 2001
1986 establishments in France
French companies disestablished in 2001
French companies established in 1986